Love Spirals Downwards was an American, California-based band, that incorporated ethereal wave, dream pop, drum and bass and electronica.

History 
Love Spirals Downwards was begun by multi-instrumentalist Ryan Lum and then-girlfriend Suzanne Perry. In 1991, Lum and Perry recorded a demo, which led to a contract with Projekt Records. Over its 8-year history, the band released four full-length albums, a career retrospective and a CD single, selling (by their own account) in excess of 40,000 albums. They were also included on over two dozen various artist compilations, including the Heavenly Voices series released by the German label Hyperium Records.

Perry's sister Kristen collaborated with Lum and Perry on two tracks on the 1998 album, Flux. One of her songs, "Psyche," was used on episode No. 501 of Dawson's Creek, originally airing on October 10, 2001. This episode was included on the Season 5 DVD set.

Jennifer Wilde (then working under her maiden name, Jennifer Ryan Fuller) performed as a guest vocalist on two tracks for Love Spirals Downwards' 1994 second release, Ardor. Her vocals on one of these songs, "Sunset Bell," were reused for a new version of the song four years later on the band's album, Flux. Wilde went on to form her own band, Liquid State, in January 2006 and is currently performing in the band Sword Tongue.

Although the band never officially broke up, in 1999, Lum began releasing music under the shortened moniker Lovespirals, featuring new vocal collaborator Anji Bee. In January 2000, career retrospective CD Temporal was released by Projekt, including new remixes of songs from Flux and promotional materials that seemed to indicate the band was still active.

Soon after, Projekt announced that Perry would release an EP under the band name Melodyguild in 2003. The release was pushed back several times before disappearing from the label's website, although Projekt did release a label sampler CD in December 2006 with a Melodyguild song.

Idylls and Ardor were reissued in 2007 in remastered editions with extra tracks.

In June 2008, Perry returned with her first body of work in almost a decade, under the Melodyguild moniker. The quartet released the four-track EP Aitu via Projekt Records.

Discography

Studio albums 
Idylls (1992, Projekt Records)
Ardor (1994, Projekt Records)
Ever (1996, Projekt Records)
Flux (1998, Projekt Records)

Compilation albums 
Temporal (2000, Projekt Records)

Compilation appearances 
 From Across This Gray Land No.3 (1992, Projekt Records)
 Hy! From Hypnotic to Hypersonic (1992, Hyperium Records)
 50 Years of Sunshine (1993, Silent Records)
 Heavenly Voices (1993, Semantic)
 Beneath The Icy Floe – A Projekt Sampler (1994, Projekt Records)
 Beneath the Icy Floe Vol. 2  (1994, Projekt Records)
 Zauber of Music Volume II (1994, Hyperium Records/Projekt Records)
 Of These Reminders (1995, Projekt Records)
 Beneath the Icy Floe Vol. 3 (1995, Projekt Records)
 Romantic Sound Sampler Vol. 2 (1995, Zillo/EFA)
 Excelsis (v.1): A Dark Noel (1995, Projekt Records)
 Wave Romantics: Dark Ballads & Underground Rock Classics (1996, Facedown/Edel)
 Beneath the Icy Floe Vol. 4 (1996, Projekt Records)
 Beneath the Icy Floe Vol. 5 (1997, Projekt Records)
 Splashed With Many a Speck (1997, Dewdrops Records)
 Life Is Too Short for Boring Music Vol. 11 (1997, EFA)
 Indie Gestion: AP 12 (1997, Alternative Press)
 The Projekt Sampler/Beneath the Icy Floe Vol. 6 (1998, Projekt Records)
 Carpe Noctem 1 (1998, Bleeding Edge Media)
 Loraine: A KUCI 88.9FM Benefit Compilation (1998, Peach Records)
 Precipice Recordings Volume 1 (1998, Precipice Records)
 Diva X Machina 3 (2000, COP International)
 Heartbeats (2000, Mascara/In-Zoom)
 Projekt 100: The Early Years, 1985 to 1995 (2000, Projekt Records)
 Darkwave: Music of the Shadows v2 (2000, K-Tel)
 Within This Infinite Ocean... (2001, Projekt Records/Borders Books)
 Excelsis Box Set (2001, Projekt Records)
 A Dark Noel: The Very Best of Excelsis (2002, Projekt Records/Hot Topic)
 Projekt: The New Face of Goth (2003, Projekt Records/Hot Topic)
 Projekt 200 (2007, Projekt Records)

References

External links 

Official website

 Band Page on the  Projekt Records site
 Discogs band page

1991 establishments in California
American dark wave musical groups
American gothic rock groups
American drum and bass musical groups
Drum and bass duos
Dream pop musical groups
Rock music groups from California
American shoegaze musical groups
Musical groups from Los Angeles
Musical groups established in 1991
Musical groups disestablished in 1999
Projekt Records artists